The ARM Guanajuato (PO-153) is a  oceanic patrol vessel in the Mexican Navy with a 57mm main gun turret and a helicopter landing pad, currently primarily used for drug interception and maritime security in Mexican territorial waters. It is also armed with SA-18 Grouse missiles. Like other ships of this class, it was designed and built in Mexican dockyards, and is sometimes referred to as a compact frigate. It was named after the Mexican state of Guanajuato.

Disaster relief operations
In an effort to assist the Haitian population following the disastrous 2008 earthquake, the Mexican government sent  of food aid to Haiti. In charge of the task was the ARM Guanajuato, the ship sailed from the Port of Coatzacoalcos, Veracruz and arrived in Port-au-Prince on June 18, 2008.

Gallery

References

Durango-class patrol vessels
Ships built in Mexico
2001 ships